Fatal Charm is a 1990 American direct-to-video thriller film directed by Fritz Kiersch under the pseudonym of Alan Smithee. The musical score was composed by James Donnellan. The film starring Christopher Atkins, Amanda Peterson, James Remar, Peggy Lipton, Andrew Robinson and Lar Park-Lincoln in the lead roles. In the United States, the film premiered February 22, 1992 on Showtime.

Story
An innocent and naive teenage girl named Valerie decides to talk to a man named Adam who was convicted of rape and murder. She refuses to believe that he is a serial killer and rapist and tries to prove to others that he is not who everyone says he is.

Cast

References

External links
 
 

1990 films
1990 direct-to-video films
1990s thriller films
1992 television films
1992 films
American thriller films
American direct-to-video films
Films directed by Fritz Kiersch
Films credited to Alan Smithee
Showtime (TV network) films
1990s English-language films
1990s American films